Mashal Khan may refer to:
 Mashal Khan (actress) (born 1997), Pakistani TV actress and model
 Lynching of Mashal Khan, Pashtun and Muslim student killed in 2017